Sophronica carissae is a species of beetle in the family Cerambycidae. It was described by Fisher in 1930.

References

Sophronica
Beetles described in 1930